Echinorhinus is the only extant genus in the family Echinorhinidae.

Taxonomy
Echinorhinidae are traditionally classified in the order Squaliformes, together with kitefin and gulper sharks. However, a phylogenetic estimate based on gene capture data and  mitochondrial data suggests that they are not squaliform sharks, but may be more likely to be appropriately classed in their own group, as a sister group to angel sharks and sawsharks. Phylogenetic placement of Echinorhinidae has been ambiguous in morphological and molecular studies, either being included within Squaliformes, considered sister to Squaliformes, or placed in a separate group with Sawsharks (Pristiophoriformes) or angel sharks (Squatiniformes). For this reason they are sometimes given their own order, Echinorhiniformes.

Etymology
The name is from Greek echinos meaning "spiny" and rhinos meaning "nose".

Species
 Echinorhinus brucus Bonnaterre, 1788 (bramble shark)
 Echinorhinus cookei Pietschmann, 1928 (prickly shark)

Description
This genus includes two extant species of uncommon, little-known sharks. They are characterized by a short nose and by rough, thorn-like dermal denticles scattered over its body, some of which may be fused together. They have no anal fin. Two small spineless dorsal fins are positioned far back.

Biology
They are ovoviviparous, with the mother retaining the egg-cases inside her body until they hatch, producing litters up to 24 pups. They feed on smaller sharks, smaller bony fish, and on crabs and cephalopods.

Distribution

See also

 List of prehistoric cartilaginous fish genera
 List of fish families

References

 
 
 
 FAO Species Catalogue Volume 4 Parts 1 and 2 Sharks of the World

Echinorhinidae
Extant Campanian first appearances
Shark genera
Taxa named by Henri Marie Ducrotay de Blainville